Abdoulaye (Abbe) Ibrahim (born July 25, 1986 in Lomé, Togo) is a football striker.

Career
Ibrahim, a Togolese youth international, has been watched by a number of top European clubs, including Manchester United. Unable to sign in Europe because of visa problems, he signed with the MetroStars in early 2005, after impressing in the pre-season. He was the first Togolese player in Major League Soccer. While showing flashes of top speed, Abbe scored two goals and added three assists in his rookie year.  His rights were traded to Toronto FC on 25 January 2007, and in April 2007, he signed a senior contract with the expansion club.

Ibrahim was waived by Toronto FC in late June 2007 to make space for the signing of Collin Samuel. In February 2008, signed a three-year contract with FC Kharkiv in Ukraine. In 2011, he moved to Dynamic Togolais.

References

External links
 TFC & Kharkiv Stats
 
 

1986 births
Living people
Togolese footballers
New York Red Bulls players
Toronto FC players
CSM Ceahlăul Piatra Neamț players
FC Kharkiv players
Ukrainian Premier League players
Expatriate soccer players in Canada
Expatriate soccer players in the United States
Expatriate footballers in Romania
Major League Soccer players
Liga I players
Togolese expatriate footballers
Expatriate footballers in Ukraine
Togolese expatriate sportspeople in Ukraine
Togolese expatriate sportspeople in Romania
Association football forwards
Togo youth international footballers